Ethmia albitogata is a moth in the family Depressariidae. It is found in central California.

The ground color of the forewings is dark
gray heavily overscaled with white. The ground color of the hindwings (including fringe) is white, but the apical area and base of the adjoining fringe are blackish. Adults are on wing in February and March.

The larvae feed on Amsinckia lunaris and possibly other Amsinckia species.

References

albitogata
Endemic fauna of California
Moths of North America
Fauna of the California chaparral and woodlands
Natural history of the California Coast Ranges
Natural history of the Central Valley (California)
Natural history of the San Francisco Bay Area
Moths described in 1907
Fauna without expected TNC conservation status